Caitlin Carver (born March 31, 1992) is an American actress.

Early years
Carver was born in Monrovia, Alabama. She attended Sparkman High School in Harvest, Alabama where she graduated in 2010. Her father is Don Carver. She grew up dancing, doing gymnastics, and playing softball and basketball, until eventually beginning theater in high school. Before her acting career took off, she worked as a professional dancer, dancing with many notable recording artists in the music industry including Beyoncé, Ne-Yo, and Pitbull.

Career
Before acting roles, Carver appeared as a dancer in a number of television series, including Nashville, Glee, Parks and Recreation, and the VH1 cheerleader soapy drama Hit the Floor in the recurring role of Mason. In 2014 she began playing guest parts in Twisted, Southland, and Stalker. Also in 2014, she was cast for the recurring role of Hayley Heinz in the ABC Family drama series The Fosters for two seasons.

While filming The Fosters, Carver was cast as Becca Arrington in the movie adaption of John Green's best selling novel Paper Towns.

In 2015, Carver was cast as Lacey Briggs in the ABC prime time television soap opera Blood & Oil alongside Don Johnson, Amber Valletta, and Scott Michael Foster.

In 2016, Carver was cast as Michelle Geiss, a reluctant beauty and aspiring photographer who is both intellectual and talented, in the ABC television pilot Model Woman. She starred opposite Andie MacDowell, Steven Weber, and Nicole Ari Parker. She was also cast in Warren Beatty's Rules Don't Apply, and made appearances on NCIS, Timeless, and Heroes Reborn.

In 2017, Carver was cast as Nancy Kerrigan alongside Margot Robbie, Allison Janney, and Sebastian Stan in the award-winning film I, Tonya.

She recurred as Muffy Tuttle on Netflix's Dear White People.

She currently recurs as Emma Jacobs in NBC's Chicago Fire.

Filmography

References

External links
 

1992 births
21st-century American actresses
21st-century American musicians
Actresses from Alabama
American female dancers
Dancers from Alabama
American film actresses
American soap opera actresses
American television actresses
Living people
Musicians from Alabama
People from Madison County, Alabama
People from Huntsville, Alabama